Tailchaser's Song is a fantasy novel by American writer Tad Williams. First released on November 21, 1985, it is Williams' first published work.

The story focuses on a personified cat named Fritti Tailchaser, set in a world of other anthropomorphic animals who live in their natural environments but each have their own language, mythology, and culture.

It is reportedly being adapted into an animated feature film.

Plot summary
The novel is set in the world as cats see it, with humans being mysterious and distrusted creatures in the eyes of feral cats. The cats see themselves as the first and most important species; the novel takes the approach that all creatures consider their kind to be the dominant species of the planet. Their myths view humans, or "M'an", as a race of deformed descendants of cats. The book makes reference to mythologies of frogs, foxes and ravens as well as more thoroughly developing a system of cat mythology.

Tailchaser's Song begins, after quoting a poem by Christopher Smart, with an exposition of the central elements of the cats' mythology, starting with a creation myth. This both frames the further developments of cat mythology and culture throughout the story and provides necessary backstory for the novel itself. Meerclar Allmother is identified as the primordial creator of all other beings, who brought forth a pair of cats who are the progenitors of the entire species as well as divine figures. Harar Goldeneye is the male, and Fela Skydancer the female. The first litter of this pair are also divine. These three cats are called the Firstborn; the middle child, Grizraz Hearteater, raises a monstrous hound out of jealousy and sets it to attack all cats. The eldest of the three, Viror Whitewind, slays the creature but is himself mortally wounded. Hearteater is driven out and flees beneath the ground where he searches out arcane lore, while Whitewind's death causes his father to flee to the heavens after searching for Hearteater in a murderous rage and causes his mother to be silent for the rest of his life. His youngest brother, Tangaloor Firefoot, renounced his claim to the throne and fled from the court out of grief. As a result of a further encounter with Firefoot, Hearteater is blinded by sun after having spent so much time beneath the earth, and retreats back beneath the ground, where it is supposed that he plots further destruction.

After this introduction, Fritti Tailchaser, a young ginger tom cat, sets out to stray from his home and clan, the Meeting Wall Clan, in search of his friend Hushpad after strange disappearances of other cats have been reported. The kitten Pouncequick follows him, and eventually catches up. Together, they set out on a long journey to visit the feline royal Court of Harar, with the intention of resolving the mystery of the disappearances. They meet a rather crazy cat named Eatbugs, who travels with them for parts of the journey to the court.  Soon they run into some Firstwalkers, cats who live in the wild, who are of a direct bloodline from Goldeneye and Skydancer. Their thane (leader), Quiverclaw, challenges Tailchaser ceremonially and is impressed enough to allow him and Pouncequick to accompany them for a time. Soon, they must part ways.

The protagonists make their way to Firsthome and the Court, but are treated there with relative indifference. They pick up a new friend, Roofshadow, and go northwest. They are captured by a group of evil cats called the Clawguard, and taken to Vastnir, an enormous mound far to the north, where the evil cat-god Grizraz Hearteater enslaves cats to take over the world, swollen in size and sitting upon a mound of dead and dying creatures. Tailchaser needs to alert the outside world and especially the court about his evil doings. Soon, Roofshadow creates a hole from above ground, and Tailchaser manages to escape, and races to Ratleaf Forest, where he asks a clan of squirrels to alert them for him in repayment for a debt contracted with their lord's brother. He feels guilty with Pouncequick, Eatbugs, and Roofshadow trapped in Vastnir because of him. He returns to the dreadful mound, where Quiverclaw and Prince Fencewalker, whom he had met at the court, come to the rescue. Lord Hearteater creates the Fikos, a dog-like monster of terrible power, out of the mound of dying creatures he had been sitting on. Tailchaser takes advantage of the chaos to rescue Pouncequick, Eatbugs, and Roofshadow. They go through the havoc of Vastnir, and lose Eatbugs, the mad cat, on the way. Roofshadow and Pouncequick escape while Tailchaser goes back to find Eatbugs. He goes into a crevice and sees Eatbugs in a near-deathlike state, and feels dazed and confused. Upon Tailchaser's uttering a prayer to Lord Tangaloor Firefoot, Hearteater's brother, Eatbugs awakens, revealing himself to actually be Firefoot incognito. Tailchaser runs out of Vastnir at Firefoot's urging, and meets his friends, while Firefoot goes to deal with Hearteater, resulting in the destruction of Vastnir.

Pouncequick, after healing from the loss of his tail, decides to return to Firsthome, the seat of the court, and stay there. Roofshadow wants to accompany him, and thus, Tailchaser is left on his quest. Firefoot appears to him in a dream, confirms that Hearteater's power is broken, and encourages Tailchaser to continue his quest for Hushpad. He goes east to Bigwater (Qu'cef) and sneaks into a boat, which seems to him like a large nut-husk. A man approaches and rows across, taking him to an island called Villa-on-Mar. There he finds none other than Hushpad, herself. Hushpad wishes to stay, though, so Tailchaser, too, stays for a time.  Gradually, Tailchaser realizes that he is still a feral cat, and does not want to live with man. He begins to see that being domestic has made Hushpad fat and lazy. Realizing that he does not belong, Tailchaser sets out to return home, to see his Meeting Wall friends, to hunt, to see Pouncequick and Roofshadow once more. The ending may be seen only as the beginning of a longer saga, but, to date, Tad Williams has yet to revisit his feline homage to Tolkien with additional writings.

Folk and folklore
The cats of Tailchaser's Song have a well established system of songs, poems, and godly figures, such as Meerclar the Allmother and her Two, Harar Goldeneye and Fela Skydancer, and the three Firstborn cats.  The cats, as one brethren, call themselves 'the Folk'.  The novel contains a developed system of cat speech and style as well, to go with their customs; very similar to what the reader finds in written editions of the works of J. R. R. Tolkien.

Language and pronunciation
Tad Williams has come up with a very large variety of terms, called the Higher Singing, used by the cats to express themselves and explain things. Included in the book is a complete glossary, as well as a character 'directory' and a map of Tailchaser's world. Also included are Williams' notes on pronunciation, which apply not only to spoken words but to first names as well (such as Fritti, Harar, or Meerclar): "'C' is always pronounced 'S': thus, Meerclar is pronounced 'Mere-slar.' In the instances where an 'S' has been used, it is only to clarify the pronunciation. For example, I felt that 'Vicl,' although the true spelling, was a little boggling; hence, 'Visl'. 'F' has a soft 'fth' sound. Vowels tend to conform to Latinate 'ah-eh-ih-oh-ooh.'"

Adaptations
In November 2011, it was announced that Animetropolis is developing a computer-animated film adaptation, with International Digital Artists, the producer of Cat Shit One, animating it. Tailchaser's Song is set to be released in the United States sometime after 2018. Peter Ramsey, the director of Rise of the Guardians, is set to be the executive producer.

See also
 Warriors (novel series) - A novel series with a similar premise

References

External links
 Official website
 Animated movie IMDB

1985 fantasy novels
1985 American novels
American fantasy novels
Novels by Tad Williams
DAW Books books
Novels about cats